Talesh Kuh (also Romanized as Ţālesh Kūh; also known as Ţālesh Kūl) is a village in Deylaman Rural District, Deylaman District, Siahkal County, Gilan Province, Iran. At the 2006 census, its population was 39, in 11 families.

References 

Populated places in Siahkal County